Buciumi is a commune in Bacău County, Western Moldavia, Romania. It is composed of two villages, Buciumi and Răcăuți. The villages were part of Ștefan cel Mare Commune until 2005, when they were split off.

At the 2011 census, 75.6% of inhabitants were Romanians and 24.4% Roma.

References

Communes in Bacău County
Localities in Western Moldavia